The Bohorok River is a river of the Langkat Regency in North Sumatra Province, Indonesia, about 1400 km northwest of the capital Jakarta. It is a tributary of Wampu River.

Events 
In October 2003, a large-scale flash flood killed 242 persons.

Geography
The river flows in the northern area of Sumatra with predominantly tropical rainforest climate (designated as Af in the Köppen-Geiger climate classification). The annual average temperature in the area is 23 °C. The warmest month is February, when the average temperature is around 24 °C, and the coldest is December, at 22 °C. The average annual rainfall is 2918 mm. The wettest month is December, with an average of 352 mm rainfall, and the driest is June, with 125 mm rainfall.

See also
List of rivers of Indonesia
List of rivers of Sumatra

References

Rivers of North Sumatra
Rivers of Indonesia